Gmina Janów may refer to either of the following rural administrative districts in Poland:
Gmina Janów, Silesian Voivodeship
Gmina Janów, Podlaskie Voivodeship